State Route 283 (SR 283) is an east–west state highway in the northeastern portion of the U.S. state of Ohio.  Its western terminus at U.S. Route 6 2½ miles northeast of Downtown Cleveland, and its eastern terminus at U.S. Route 20 (Erie Street) in Painesville.  Most of the route is known as Lakeshore Boulevard until it approaches the Grand River in Lake County. During its final stretch, its name changes to Olive Street, River Street, and finally to Richmond Street.  The entire highway is part of the Lake Erie Circle Tour.

Route description

History

1932 – Original route established; route east of current State Route 175 was State Route 175 before 1929, and was then the former State Route 6 from 1929 to 1932.

Major intersections

References

283
Transportation in Cuyahoga County, Ohio
Transportation in Lake County, Ohio